Sfântu Gheorghe is a commune in Tulcea County, Northern Dobruja, Romania. It is located at the end of the southern arm of the Danube near the Black Sea, in the Dobruja region. It is composed of a single village, Sfântu Gheorghe.

Description
Sfântu Gheorghe has a center with a town hall, a pub and some food stores. It is surrounded by one-storey houses, some of which have a Byzantine influence.

Economy
Inhabitants fish and work as tourist guides for visitors of the channels of the Danube.

The Sfântu Gheorghe Film festival
Sfântu Gheorghe hosts the Anonimul International Independent Film Festival.

Sightseeing
 The Danube channels

References

External links

Homepage of the film festival

Communes in Tulcea County
Localities in Northern Dobruja
Populated coastal places in Romania